Louis Joseph Van Schaick (July 1, 1875February 14, 1945) was an officer in the United States Army and a Medal of Honor recipient for his actions in the Philippine–American War.

Biography
Van Schaick was born on July 1, 1875, in Cobleskill, New York, to John Van Schaick and the former Frances Elizabeth Shaver. Among his siblings was John van Schaick Jr., who later married Julia Asenath Romaine (a daughter of Benjamin F. Romaine of New York City).

Van Schaick attended West Point as a member of the 1900 class but left one year before graduating to join the army. While serving in the Philippines, he held the governorships of Cavite (1905–1907) and Mindoro (1908–1912).

He later went on to fight with General John J. Pershing in pursuit of Pancho Villa and (as a lieutenant colonel) was part of the 1st expeditionary force sent to France, again with General Pershing. He was retired for disability in August 1934 with the rank of colonel.

He was later imprisoned during the Japanese occupation of the Philippines and died shortly after his release on February 14, 1945.

Medal of Honor citation
Rank and organization: First Lieutenant, 4th U.S. Infantry. Place and date: Near Nasugbu, Batangas, Philippine Islands, November 23, 1901. Entered service at: Cobleskill, N.Y. Birth: Cobleskill, N.Y. G.O. No.: 33, 1913. Date of issue: Unknown.

Citation
While in pursuit of a band of insurgents was the first of his detachment to emerge from a canyon, and seeing a column of insurgents and fearing they might turn and dispatch his men as they emerged one by one from the canyon, galloped forward and closed with the insurgents, thereby throwing them into confusion until the arrival of others of the detachment.

See also

List of Medal of Honor recipients
List of Philippine–American War Medal of Honor recipients

References

External links

1875 births
1945 deaths
American people of Dutch descent
United States Army Medal of Honor recipients
United States Army officers
People from Cobleskill, New York
American military personnel of the Philippine–American War
United States Military Academy alumni
Philippine–American War recipients of the Medal of Honor
Burials at the Manila American Cemetery